Frank G. Davies (17 May 1910 – 25 October 1989) was an Australian rules footballer who played with South Melbourne in the Victorian Football League (VFL).

Davies, a South Ballarat recruit, played at South Melbourne for three seasons. He kicked two goals, from a forward pocket, in South Melbourne's 1935 VFL Grand Final loss to Collingwood. In 1934 and 1936, he missed selection in the South Melbourne grand final team, despite playing in their preliminary final win each year.

References

External links

1910 births
1989 deaths
Australian rules footballers from Victoria (Australia)
Sydney Swans players
South Ballarat Football Club players